Seth Weil (born March 9, 1987) is an American rower from the San Francisco Bay Area. He was named USRowing Male Athlete of the Year in 2015. He competed in the men's coxless four event at the 2016 Summer Olympics. He discovered rowing his freshman year at University of California, Davis.

References

External links
 

1987 births
Living people
American male rowers
Olympic rowers of the United States
Rowers at the 2016 Summer Olympics
University of California, Davis alumni
Place of birth missing (living people)
World Rowing Championships medalists for the United States